Lina Ljungblom (born 15 October 2001) is a Swedish ice hockey player and member of the Swedish national ice hockey team, currently playing with MoDo Hockey Dam of the Swedish Women's Hockey League (SDHL).

Playing career 
From 2015 to 2019, Ljungblom played for Skövde IK, splitting her time between the club's boys' U16 and U18 sides, as well as the club's Damtvåan women's side. In October 2018, she was loaned to HV71 in the SDHL for a game after HV71 suffered a number of injuries. She scored twice in her SDHL debut, as HV71 beat Brynäs IF 6-1.

For the 2019–20 season, she chose to spend most of her time with HV71 in the SDHL, appearing in only four games with Skövde's boys' U20 squad – though she scored five points in that span. She missed large parts of the season, however, after breaking her collarbone in October 2019. She finished the season with 5 points in 20 games for HV71, adding another 3 points in 6 playoff games as the club made it to the championship finals before the season was cancelled due to the COVID-19 pandemic in Sweden.

After voicing concerns about her development with HV71, she left the club to sign with Modo Hockey ahead of the 2020–21 SDHL season. In November 2020, she was suspended for three matches for abuse of an official after shouting "fuck you" at the referee in a 5–3 loss to SDE Hockey.

International career   
Ljungblom has represented Sweden three times at IIHF World U18 Championships, in 2017, 2018, and 2019, picking up a total of 10 points across 16 games and winning silver in 2018.

She represented Sweden at the 2019 IIHF Women's World Championship, not picking up any points in five games as the country was relegated from the IIHF Top Division for the first time in history.

References

External links

2001 births
Living people
People from Skövde Municipality
Swedish women's ice hockey forwards
Ice hockey players at the 2016 Winter Youth Olympics
Youth Olympic gold medalists for Sweden
Modo Hockey Dam players
HV71 Dam players
Olympic ice hockey players of Sweden
Ice hockey players at the 2022 Winter Olympics
Sportspeople from Västra Götaland County